Běstovice is a municipality and village in Ústí nad Orlicí District in the Pardubice Region of the Czech Republic. It has about 400 inhabitants.

References

External links

Betovice